The Jozef Kroner Awards (in Slovak: Cena Jozefa Kronera) are bestowed annually since 2001 by the Jozef Kroner Foundation, which was established after the death of Jozef Kroner to remember his art and personality.

The awards are presented in two categories. For lasting contribution to the world of theatre (lifelong work), and for the most remarkable achievement in the area of theatre, film, television, radio or the art of dubbing.

In 2001-2005 awards were presented in Bratislava, but since 2006 they have been presented in the Jozef Gregor Tajovský Theatre in Zvolen. From 2004 the Jozef Kroner Foundation extended the scope of the Jozef Kroner Awards by including amateur actors. Awards in this category are presented on the occasion of Scenic Harvest in Martin.

Winners

 Ladislav Chudík
 Andrej Mojžiš
 Jozef Dóczy
 Milan Sládek
 Karol L Zachar
 Elo Romančík
 Leopold Haverl
 Emília Vášáryová
 Emil Horváth
 Marián Geišberg
 Eva Krížiková
 Milan Kiš
 Ivan Vojtek Sr 
 Vladimír Rohoň
 Mária Kráľovičová
 Eugen Libezňuk
 Kveta Stražanová
 Dušan Jamrich 
 Božidara Turzonovová

References

External links
 Official website
 Alliance of the Kroner's Natives

Slovak awards
Awards established in 2001
2001 establishments in Slovakia